is a former Japanese football player.

Playing career
Tanoue was born in Satsumasendai on February 5, 1980. After graduating from high school, he joined J1 League club Kashiwa Reysol in 1998. He could hardly play in the match until 2001. He got opportunity to play as offensive midfielder from late 2002 to 2003. However he could hardly play in the match from 2004. In 2006, he moved to Yokohama F. Marinos. However he could not play at all in the match. In 2007, he moved to J2 League club Vegalta Sendai. He became a regular player as left side back. He retired end of 2008 season.

Club statistics

References

External links

1980 births
Living people
Association football people from Kagoshima Prefecture
Japanese footballers
J1 League players
J2 League players
Kashiwa Reysol players
Yokohama F. Marinos players
Vegalta Sendai players
Association football midfielders